Mariano Albert Reigada was a Spanish anarcho-syndicalist.

Biography 
Born in Madrid, he was a cabinetmaker by profession. He was a member of the CNT. After the outbreak of the Spanish Civil War he joined the republican forces. During the war, he served as political commissar of the 98th Mixed Brigade. After the war, he was captured by the nationalists, who imprisoned him. He was shot in Madrid Eastern Cemetery on April 27, 1940. His brothers Francisco and Jesús were also shot by the Francoist dictatorship.

References

Bibliography
 
 
 

1940 deaths
Confederación Nacional del Trabajo members
People executed by Francoist Spain

Spanish anarchists
Executed anarchists